Beer keg registration is a legal requirement in some U.S. states and localities that identification tags or labels be affixed to beer kegs upon retail sale. They often consist of requirements that tags and records retained by the retailer list the name and address of the purchaser, the date and location where the beer will be served, and other information.  These laws vary widely in their specifics and enforcement.  There appears to have been little academic study of the efficacy of beer keg registration laws.

List of American states with beer keg registration laws

Arkansas
California –  or more
Connecticut
District of Columbia
Georgia
Idaho
Indiana
Iowa
Kansas
Kentucky
Maryland
Massachusetts
Minnesota
Missouri
Montana
Nebraska
New Hampshire
New Mexico
New York –  or more
North Carolina
North Dakota
Ohio
Oregon –  or more
Rhode Island
South Carolina
Vermont
Virginia
Washington –  or more

The state of Utah does not have a keg registration law, but requires keg users to buy a temporary beer permit, and limits kegs to low-alcohol beer only.

References

External links
Keg Registration Keg Registration laws have been passed in 25 of 50 states. See if your state is on the list.

Alcohol law in the United States